James Gull (20 September 1928 – 7 November 2007) was an Australian rules footballer who played with South Melbourne in the Victorian Football League (VFL).

Gull was a prolific centre half-forward in Victorian country football, especially in the Ballarat Football League, where he played for Daylesford.

He started his career at Kenmare in 1946, he won the South Mallee Football League Best and fairest that year as a sixteen-year-old. He made his way to South Melbourne. During his time at South Melbourne he struggled with injury, breaking three ribs.

In 1951 he left South Melbourne and moved to Rupanyup where he operated a Milk bar.  He also was the playing coach of the town's football team. As a playing coach, Gull won the Toohey Medal in 1953, while with Rupanyup in the Wimmera Football League and later was the league leading goalkicker in 1957.

In 1958 he joined Daylesford and would go on to kick 889 goals in the Ballarat Football League. He topped the league's goal-kicking eight times, every year from 1958 to 1964 and again in 1968. His best season came in 1961 when he captain-coached Daylesford to a premiership and kicked a league record 159 goals. During the year he set another record when he kicked 21 goals and 13 behinds in a game against North Ballarat.

After leaving Daylesford, he continued playing football, at Elaine and Natte-Bealiba. He is estimated to have played 560 senior games over the course of his career.

In 1971 he played one game with  North Ballarat with his son, Stewart Gull, who also played for South Melbourne.

His daughter, Robyn Maher, represented Australia at basketball.

References

1928 births
Australian rules footballers from Victoria (Australia)
Sydney Swans players
Daylesford Football Club players
Rupanyup Football Club players
2007 deaths